Menesia clytoides is a species of beetle in the family Cerambycidae. It was described by Charles Joseph Gahan in 1912. It is known from Borneo.

References

Menesia
Beetles described in 1912